Gowrie Station is a rural locality in the Shire of Murweh, Queensland, Australia. In the  Gowrie Station had a population of 15 people.

Geography 
The Mitchell Highway passes through the locality entering from the south-west (Charleville) and exiting to the north (Augathella).

The predominant land use is grazing on native vegetation.

History 
In the  Gowrie Station had a population of 15 people.

Economy 
There are a number of homesteads in the locality:

 Barradeen
 Gowrie
 North Yarrawonga
 Woolabra
 Yarrawonga

References 

Shire of Murweh
Localities in Queensland